Chicks and Balances is an anthology of fantasy stories, edited by Esther Friesner and John Helfers, with a cover by Tom Wood. It consists of works featuring female protagonists by (mostly) female authors. It was first published in trade paperback and e-book form by Baen Books in July 2015. It was the sixth of a series of similarly themed anthologies, the first five of which were edited by Friesner alone.

Summary
The book collects 22 short stories and novelettes by various fantasy authors, with an introduction and a section of notes about the authors by Friesner.

Contents
 "Introduction" (Esther Friesner)
 "A Chick Off the Old Block" (Jody Lynn Nye)
 "The Girls from the Hood" (Jim C. Hines)
 "Smackdown at Walmart" (Elizabeth A. Vaughan)
 "The Mammyth" (Harry Turtledove)
 "Give a Girl a Sword" (Kerrie L. Hughes)
 "Bite Me" (Steven Harper Piziks)
 "Dark Pixii" (Wen Spencer)
 "A Warrior Looks at 40" (Julie S. Mandala)
 "Roll Model" (Esther Friesner)
 "Second Hand Hero" (Jean Rabe)
 "Burying Treasure" (Alex Shvartsman)
 "Calling the Mom Squad" (Sarah A. Hoyt)
 "Rabid Weasels" (Robin Wayne Bailey)
 "A Girl's Home Is Her Rent-Controlled Castle" (Laura Resnick)
 ". . . And Your Enemies Closer" (Lee Martindale)
 "Knot and the Dragon" (P. C. Hodgell)
 "The Rules of the Game: A Poker Boy Story" (Dean Wesley Smith)
 "Beginner's Luck" (Linda L. Donahue)
 "One Touch of Hippolyta" (Laura Frankos)
 "Saving Private Slime" (Louisa Swann)
 "Unearthing the Undying Armor" (Elizabeth Ann Scarborough)
 "Fashion and the Snarkmeisters" (Kristine Kathryn Rusch)
 "About the Authors" (Esther Friesner)

References

2015 anthologies
Fantasy anthologies